Northeast St. Louis is an unorganized territory in Saint Louis County, Minnesota, United States. The population was 177 at the 2000 census.

Geography
According to the United States Census Bureau, the unorganized territory has a total area of 540.1 square miles (1,398.8 km2); 459.8 square miles (1,190.9 km2) is land and 80.3 square miles (208.0 km2) (14.87%) is water.

Demographics
At the 2000 census there were 177 people, 81 households, and 57 families living in the unorganized territory. The population density was 0.4 people per square mile (0.1/km2). There were 402 housing units at an average density of 0.9/sq mi (0.3/km2).  The racial makeup of the unorganized territory was 94.92% White, 3.39% Native American, and 1.69% from two or more races.
Of the 81 households 21.0% had children under the age of 18 living with them, 59.3% were married couples living together, 4.9% had a female householder with no husband present, and 28.4% were non-families. 23.5% of households were one person and 3.7% were one person aged 65 or older. The average household size was 2.19 and the average family size was 2.47.

The age distribution was 19.2% under the age of 18, 2.8% from 18 to 24, 17.5% from 25 to 44, 42.9% from 45 to 64, and 17.5% 65 or older. The median age was 50 years. For every 100 females, there were 113.3 males. For every 100 females age 18 and over, there were 110.3 males.

The median household income was $40,990 and the median family income  was $41,406. Males had a median income of $39,464 versus $20,625 for females. The per capita income for the unorganized territory was $17,631. About 3.0% of families and 7.8% of the population were below the poverty line, including 18.2% of those under the age of eighteen and none of those sixty five or over.

References
Notes

Populated places in St. Louis County, Minnesota
Unorganized territories in Minnesota

es:Municipio de Northland (condado de St. Louis, Minnesota)